Amber Agha, also credited as Amber Agar or Amber Aga, is an English actress, best known for her role in the British television series Murder City and her supporting role in Shakespeare & Hathaway: Private Investigators.

Early life
She lived in Africa as a child, but returned to England for her education at Francis Holland School. She obtained a law degree at Cambridge University, and afterwards trained at RADA.

Acting
Agar has performed at the National Theatre in The Man of Mode as Harriet, alongside Tom Hardy and Hayley Atwell. Other stage work includes the Orange Tree Theatre, Soho Theatre, Riverside Studios with Ed Stoppard, and Hampstead Theatre.

She played Dr Anvar "Annie" Parvez in the television series Murder City. She appeared as a guest artist (twice) in Holby City, on EastEnders, Totally Frank, Green Wing, Doctors and The Bill.

In 2009 WhatsOnStage named her as one of the "exciting young actors" of 2009 for her portrayal of Marian in Clare Bayley's The Container at the Young Vic directed by Tom Wright, with Abhin Galeya and Doreene Blackstock. Also in 2009 she appeared as campaigner Yasmin Khan in This Much is True at Theatre503, directed by Tim Roseman and written by Paul Unwin, and also featuring Justine Waddell and Gerald Kyd. The show was based on first hand accounts of the Jean Charles de Menezes case, including testimony heard for the first time.

In 2010 she appeared in Lewis; with Brenda Fricker in a special episode of Casualty; and in a lead guest role in the penultimate episode of Waking The Dead (aired early in 2011). In 2011 she started rehearsals for Reading Hebron at the Orange Tree Theatre.

She appeared as Detective Inspector Christina Marlowe in all 20 episodes of the first two series of Shakespeare & Hathaway: Private Investigators in 2018 and 2019.

Writing 
She has been a published poet for Arrival Press and Pyramid Press for a number of years. She was the Winner of The Times International Poetry Competition at university. In 2010 her collection In the Arms of Lyra was published as an ebook and paperback.

Producing 
Agar is producer for her company Cheeky Maggot Productions CMP. Showcasing new writing at the Hampstead Theatre, Soho Theatre, the Royal Academy of Dramatic Art, the Lost Festival (winning entry) and the Cockpit Theatre. The company has worked with prominent actors including Ewen Macintosh and Lucy Davenport.

Filmography

Film

Television

External links
 
 Website

1976 births
English television actresses
Living people
People educated at Francis Holland School
Alumni of RADA
Alumni of the University of Cambridge
People from Hampstead